Luis María Linde de Castro (born May 15, 1945 in Madrid) is a Spanish economist and civil servant who has served as governor of the Spanish Central Bank from 2012 until 2018.

Early life and education 
Linde graduated with a degree in economic sciences from the Universidad Complutense de Madrid with top marks.

Career 
Linde was the trade attaché at the Spanish embassy in the Soviet Union and worked for the Ministry of Economy. In 1983 he was appointed to the Banco de España. Between 2005 and 2008 he was executive for Spain in the Inter-American Development Bank.

On May 25, 2012 Linde succeeded Vicente Salas as a member of the governing council of the Banco de España. A few days later Miguel Ángel Fernández Ordóñez resigned as chairman of the bank and Linde was appointed. Another candidate for the post, who was favoured by the European Central Bank (ECB) and financial markets, was José Manuel González Paramo, a former member of the Executive Board of the ECB. Under the bank's statutes Linde will have to retire in three years when he turns 70, and will not therefore be able to complete a six-year term.

Under Linde, who was named only two days before Spain requested a European bailout, the central bank came under fire for its handling of the banking crisis and maintained a neutral stance on economic policy.

Other activities

International organizations
 International Monetary Fund (IMF), Ex-Officio Alternate Member of the Board of Governors (2012-2018)

Non-profit organizations
 Fundación pro Real Academia Española, Chairman
 Official Credit Institute (ICO), Member of the Board of Directors
 Princess of Asturias Foundation, Member of the Board of Trustees

Corporate boards
 Compañía Española de Crédito a la Exportación (CESCE), Adviser to the Board of Directors (2009-2011)

References 

Spanish economists
Governors of the Bank of Spain
1945 births
Living people
Complutense University of Madrid alumni